Acacia resinimarginea is a tree or shrub belonging to the genus Acacia and the subgenus Juliflorae that is endemic to western Australia.

Description
It has glabrous and terete branchlets and resinous ribs when still immature. Like most species of Acacia, it has phyllodes rather than true leaves. The glabrous phyllodes have a slightly recurved tapered point and resinous nerve at the apex of each of the four angles. It blooms from August to October producing yellow flowers. The mottled brown seeds inside are arranged longitudinally.

Distribution
Acacia resinimarginea is native to a large area in the Mid West and Wheatbelt region of Western Australia where it is often situated on undulating plains growing mostly in sandy but sometimes in loamy soils, often as pure stands. It is found from around Perenjori in the west to around Kambalda in the south east and up to around Leonora in the north.

See also
List of Acacia species

References

resinimarginea
Acacias of Western Australia
Taxa named by William Vincent Fitzgerald
Plants described in 1904